This is a list of Tibetan dishes and foods. Tibetan cuisine includes the culinary traditions and practices of Tibet and its peoples, many of whom reside in India and Nepal. It reflects the Tibetan landscape of mountains and plateaus and includes influences from neighbors (including other countries India and Nepal). It is known for its use of noodles, goat, yak, mutton, dumplings, cheese (often from yak or goat milk), butter (also from animals adapted to the Tibetan climate) and soups.

The cuisine of Tibet is quite distinct from that of its neighbors. Tibetan crops must be able grow at the high altitudes, although a few areas in Tibet are low enough to grow such crops as rice, oranges, bananas, and lemon. Since only a few crops grow at such high altitudes, many features of Tibetan cuisine are imported, such as tea, rice and others.

The most important crop in Tibet is barley. Flour milled from roasted barley, called tsampa, is the staple food of Tibet. It is eaten mostly mixed with the national beverage Butter tea. Meat dishes are likely to be yak, goat, or mutton, often dried, or cooked into a spicy stew with potatoes. Many Tibetans do not eat fish because fish are one of the Eight Auspicious Symbols of Buddhism.

Tibetan dishes and foods

 Chebureki – a deep-fried turnover with a filling of ground or minced meat and onions
 Cheser mog – rice, with melted yak butter, brown sugar, raisins and salt
 Chexo – a rice and yogurt dish
 Dropa Khatsa – a dish of stewed tripe, with curry, fennel, monosodium glutamate and salt
 Koendain – a pastry made from barley grain and yeast (fermented into a light barley beer), with tsampa, dry curd cheese, wild ginseng, and brown sugar. This pastry is often served during the Tibetan New Year and Losar as a starter.
 Gyabra – a pancake made with barley flour, yak butter, dry cheese curds and sugar
 Gyagoh – In Tibetan cuisine, Gyagoh is a chafing dish in the Han Chinese style; a hot pot of vermicelli, kombu, mushrooms, meatballs, bamboo sprouts and salt. It has special significance, generally eaten by senior monks during important ceremonies.
 Gyathuk – noodles, much like those of the Han variety, made with eggs, flour and bone soup
 Gyuma – a blood sausage made with yak or sheep's blood in Tibetan cuisine. Rice or roasted barley flour can be added as filler. 
 Khapsey – cookies or biscuits that are deep fried and usually made during celebrations such as the Losar (Tibetan New Year) or weddings
 Laphing – a spicy cold mung bean noodle dish in Tibetan and Nepalese cuisine
 Lowa Khatsa – made of pieces of fried animal lung and spices
 Lunggoi Katsa – stewed sheep's head with curry, fennel, monosodium glutamate and salt
 Masan – a pastry made with tsampa, dry cubic or curd cheese, yak butter, brown sugar and water
 Momo – a South Asian dumpling native to Tibet, Nepal, Bhutan and India
 Gong'a Momo – filled with meat paste
 Sha Momo – filled with beef or mutton
 Shoogoi Momo – prepared using mashed potato with dough, shaped into balls, with a minced meat filling, served with bread crumbs
 Sepen – hot sauce made with chillies as the primary ingredient and other spices depending on the recipe
 Sergem – made from milk once the butter from the milk is extracted. It is then put in a vessel and heated and when it is about to boil, sour liquid called "chakeu" is added and this leads to the separation of sergem from that milk
 Sha Phaley – bread stuffed with seasoned beef and cabbage
 Sha Shingbee – a stir-fry dish of sliced mutton with green beans
 Shab Tra – stir-fried meat tossed with celery, carrots and fresh green chili
 Sweet sour and spicy vegetable gravy – a soup-like vegetable curry in Tibetan cuisine that is often served with tingmo steamed bread
 Tsampa – roasted barley flour, it is a staple food
 Xab Pagri – a patty, usually baked dough, stuffed with meat paste
 Xabbatog –  a dough stuffed with shredded turnips and dry curd cheese and cooked with bone soup
 Yak butter – butter made from the milk of the domesticated yak (Bos grunniens). It is a staple food item and trade item for herding communities in south Central Asia and the Tibetan Plateau.
 Yurla – a wheat pastry with butter, particularly common in Nyainrong County in northern Tibet

Beverages
 Ara – an alcoholic beverage made from rice, maize, millet, or wheat, which may be either fermented or distilled. Circa the early 1900s, ara was frequently imported from China.
 Butter tea – a drink of the people in the Himalayan regions of Nepal, Bhutan, India (particularly in Ladakh, Sikkim) and, most famously, Tibet. Traditionally, it is made from tea leaves, yak butter, water, and salt, although butter made from cow's milk is increasingly used, given its wider availability and lower cost. Yak butter tea has been described as the "Tibetan national beverage."
 Chhang – traditional Tibetan beer

Breads

 Balep –  a bannock quick bread
 Balep korkun – a round and flat bread that is consumed mainly in central Tibet
 Tingmo – a steamed bread

Cheeses

 Chhurpi – there are two varieties of chhurpi, a soft variety (consumed as a side dish with rice) and a hard variety (chewed like a betel nut)
 Chura kampo – made from the curds left over from boiling buttermilk, there are many possible shapes for chura kampo
 Chura loenpa – a soft cheese, similar to cottage cheese, made from the curds that are left over from boiling buttermilk
 Shosha – a pungent cheese and staple food that is often made from animals suited to the climate such as yak and goat

Desserts and sweets
 Dre-si – a sweet dish made with rice that is cooked in unsalted butter and mixed with raisins, droma (gourd shaped root found in Tibet), dates and nuts. This dish is usually served only on Losar (Tibetan new year).
 Thue – a delicacy in Tibetan cuisine made with dri cheese (or sometimes Parmesan or other hard cheeses), brown sugar (usually porang) and unsalted sweet cream butter
 Tu – a cheese cake, made with yak butter, brown sugar and water, made into a pastry.

Dough foods
 Chetang Goiche – strips of dough fried with rapeseed oil, topped with brown sugar
 Baktsamarkhu – a dough shaped into balls with melted butter, brown sugar, and dry curd cheese. It has a sweet and sour taste and is red in color.
 Samkham Papleg – a dough fried in yak butter or rapeseed oil
 Sokham Bexe – fried dough with butter and minced meat

Soups and stews

 Dre-thuk – includes yak or sheep soup stock along with rice, different types of Tibetan cheeses and droma, a type of Tibetan root
 Guthuk – a noodle soup in Tibetan cuisine that is eaten two days before Losar, the Tibetan New Year
 Qoiri – a stew of mutton chops, made with flour, shredded wheat, chillies, dry curd cheese, water and salt
 Thenthuk – hand pulled noodle soup
 Thukpa – a noodle soup that originated in the eastern part of Tibet. Thupka has been described as a "generic Tibetan word for any soup or stew combined with noodles."
 Bhakthuk – a common Tibetan cuisine noodle soup that includes small 
 Tsam-thuk – prepared with yak or sheep soup stock and tsampa (roasted barley flour) as well as a variety of Tibetan cheeses

See also

 Beer in Tibet 
 Tibetan culture
 Sikkimese cuisine

Notes

References

External links
 

 
Tibetan